Ophiobolus cannabinus is a plant pathogen that causes stem canker on hemp.

References 

Fungal plant pathogens and diseases
Hemp diseases
Pleosporales